Cheryl Waters may refer to:
Cheryl Waters (actress) (born 1947), American film and television actress
Cheryl Waters (radio personality), American radio host and disk jockey